Since 10 December 2020, The Central African Republic is administratively divided into 20 prefectures (Sango: kodoro kômanda-kôta) and the capital city of Bangui, which is an autonomous commune (Sango: kôta-gbata).

Each prefecture is governed by a local assembly called General Council (Conseil Général), presided by a Prefect (Préfet). The prefectures are further subdivided into 71 sub-prefectures.

Prefectures are all named after major rivers passing through their areas:

 Ubangi, Nana, Mambéré, Kadeï, Lobaye, M'Poko, Ombella, Sangha, Kémo, Ouaka, Kotto, and Mbomou all flow into the Congo River.
 Pendé, Ouham, Gribingui, Bamingui, Bangoran, and Vakaga all flow into the Chari River, and then into Lake Chad.

(Basse ("Lower") means downstream, and Haut or Haute ("Upper") means upstream.)

See also
 ISO 3166-2:CF

References

Sources
 Central African Republic

 
Subdivisions of the Central African Republic
Central African Republic, Prefectures
Central African Republic 1
Prefectures, Central African Republic
Central African Republic geography-related lists